Chaos Monkeys: Obscene Fortune and Random Failure in Silicon Valley is an autobiography written by American tech entrepreneur Antonio García Martínez. The book likens Silicon Valley to the "chaos monkeys" of society. In the book, the author details his career experiences with launching a tech startup, selling it to Twitter, and working at Facebook from its pre-IPO stage.

Summary 
Chaos Monkeys recounts Antonio Garcia Martinez's career path. It starts as Martinez explains his quant work at Goldman, to an existing startup, to his own startup, and ultimately to larger Silicon Valley companies. He writes about real situations and discloses the inside stories he believes fill every industry. Garcia attempts to explain how advertising technology, startups, and venture capital work.

Reception 
Bloomberg Businessweek reported, "Unlike most founding narratives that flow out of the Valley, Chaos Monkeys dives into the unburnished, day-to-day realities: the frantic pivots, the enthusiastic ass-kissing, the excruciating internal politics.... [Garcia] can be rude, but he's shrewd, too." In CNN's review, the headline says the book "compares Facebook's culture to fascism but fails to prove it". TechCrunch wrote, "If you're in a startup or even plan to sue one, Chaos Monkeys is the book to read."

In 2021, after Martínez was fired from Apple weeks after being hired, the book became notorious for what some claimed was misogynistic content, including the following and many similar passages:

The Verge, however, quoted those passages in a fuller context. García Martínez was contrasting "women in the Bay Area" to the impressively capable woman he was involved with, who had the opposite characteristics.

On May 10, 2021, Business Insider reported that the author had been hired by Apple. Opposition quickly mounted within the firm, with over 2,000 employees signing a letter demanding an investigation into the failures of the background check process that allowed him to be hired. On May 12, Apple announced that Martínez had been fired.

References

External links 
 
 Author website

Business books
Autobiographies
2016 non-fiction books
HarperCollins books